The 27th Independent Spirit Awards, honoring the best independent films of 2011, were presented on February 25, 2012. The nominations were announced on November 29, 2011. The ceremony was hosted by Seth Rogen.

Winners and nominees

{| class="wikitable"
!Best Feature
!Best Director
|-
| The Artist
 50/50
 Beginners
 The Descendants
 Drive
 Take Shelter
| Michel Hazanavicius – The Artist
 Mike Mills – Beginners
 Jeff Nichols – Take Shelter
 Alexander Payne – The Descendants
 Nicolas Winding Refn – Drive
|-
!Best Male Lead
!Best Female Lead
|-
| Jean Dujardin – The Artist
 Demián Bichir – A Better Life
 Ryan Gosling – Drive
 Woody Harrelson – Rampart
 Michael Shannon – Take Shelter
| Michelle Williams – My Week with Marilyn
 Lauren Ambrose – About Sunny
 Rachael Harris – Natural Selection
 Adepero Oduye – Pariah
 Elizabeth Olsen – Martha Marcy May Marlene
|-
!Best Supporting Male
!Best Supporting Female
|-
| Christopher Plummer – Beginners
 Albert Brooks – Drive
 John Hawkes – Martha Marcy May Marlene
 John C. Reilly – Cedar Rapids
 Corey Stoll – Midnight in Paris
| Shailene Woodley – The Descendants
 Jessica Chastain – Take Shelter
 Anjelica Huston – 50/50
 Janet McTeer – Albert Nobbs
 Harmony Santana – Gun Hill Road
|-
!Best Screenplay
!Best First Screenplay
|-
| Alexander Payne, Nat Faxon, and Jim Rash – The Descendants
 Joseph Cedar – Footnote
 Michel Hazanavicius – The Artist
 Tom McCarthy – Win Win
 Mike Mills – Beginners
| Will Reiser – 50/50
 Mike Cahill and Brit Marling – Another Earth
 J. C. Chandor – Margin Call
 Patrick deWitt – Terri
 Phil Johnston – Cedar Rapids
|-
!Best First Feature
!Best Documentary Feature
|-
| Margin Call
 Another Earth
 In the Family
 Martha Marcy May Marlene
 Natural Selection
| The Interrupters
 An African Election
 Bill Cunningham New York
 The Redemption of General Butt Naked
 We Were Here
|-
!Best Cinematography
!Best International Film
|-
| Guillaume Schiffman – The Artist
 Joel Hodge – Bellflower
 Benjamin Kasulke – The Off Hours
 Darius Khondji – Midnight in Paris
 Jeffrey Waldron – The Dynamiter
| A Separation • Iran The Kid with a Bike • Belgium / France / Italy
 Melancholia • Denmark / France / Germany / Sweden
 Shame • UK
 Tyrannosaur • UK
|}

Films with multiple nominations and awards

Special awards

John Cassavetes AwardPariah
 Bellflower
 Circumstance
 The Dynamiter
 Hello Lonesome

Truer Than Fiction Award
Where Soldiers Come From
 Bombay Beach
 Hell and Back Again

Piaget Producers Award
Sophia Lin – Take Shelter
 Chad Burris – Mosquita y Mari
 Josh Mond – Martha Marcy May Marlene

Someone to Watch Award
Mark Jackson – Without
 Simon Arthur – Silver Tongues
 Nicholas Ozeki – Mamitas

Robert Altman Award
 Margin Call – J. C. Chandor, Tiffany Little Canfield, Bernard Telsey, Penn Badgley, Simon Baker, Paul Bettany, Jeremy Irons, Mary McDonnell, Demi Moore, Zachary Quinto, Kevin Spacey, and Stanley Tucci

References

External links
 2012 Awards at IMDb

2011
Independent Spirit Awards